The Som class were a series of submarines built for the Imperial Russian Navy in 1904–1907. They were designed by the Electric Boat Company and ordered in the 1904 emergency programme at the time of the Russo-Japanese War. The boats were built in St. Petersburg and were designed to be transportable by train. The vessel was sold and delivered to Russia in sections and re-assembled in St. Petersburg.

Ships

Wreck found

In July 2015 it was reported that the wreck of Som (Сом) had been located in Swedish waters.

References

External links

Submarine classes
Submarines of the Imperial Russian Navy